Grevillea ceratocarpa is a species of flowering plant in the family Proteaceae and is endemic to inland areas of the south-west of Western Australia. It is an erect or spreading shrub with softly-hairy, narrowly elliptic or narrowly egg-shaped leaves with the narrower end towards the base, and creamy-white flowers.

Description

Taxonomy
Grevillea ceratocarpa was first formally described in 1904 by Ludwig Diels in Ernst Georg Pritzel's Botanische Jahrbücher für Systematik, Pflanzengeschichte und Pflanzengeographie, based on plant material collected by Alexander Forrest in the Coolgardie district. The specific epithet (ceratocarpa) means "horn-fruited".

Distribution and habitat
Grevillea ceratocarpa usually grows on sandplains and is found near Merredin in the Avon Wheatbelt and Coolgardie biogeographic regions of inland south-western Western Australia.

Conservation status
This species is listed as "not threatened", by the Government of Western Australia Department of Biodiversity, Conservation and Attractions".

References

ceratocarpa
Eudicots of Western Australia
Proteales of Australia
Taxa named by Ludwig Diels
Plants described in 1904